, also known as Harvest Moon: Innocent Life, is a farming simulation video game for the PlayStation Portable (PSP). It is a spin-off of the Story of Seasons series of games, and was released on April 27, 2006, in Japan and in 2007 for the rest of the world.

A special edition of the game was released for the PlayStation 2 (PS2) called  on March 29, 2007, in Japan and February 12, 2008, in North America. Apart from minor changes, the PS2 version is essentially a port of the original.

Gameplay
The game takes place on the relic-filled Heartflame Island which can be explored by walking or riding on a buggy. Players have the ability to explore the island's ruins and even visit a volcano. All these areas have their own terrain and resembles a tropical paradise. In order to explore all over the island the player must collect jewels and break the seal.

Aside from growing plants and raising livestock, the player has weekly requests from Volcano Town for help with a job.

Development
The game features a new art style that steps away from the traditional style of the previous Harvest Moon games. It focuses more on solving a main storyline like traditional RPGs, rather than concentrating on farm works. The concept used in Innocent Life would be continued on the Rune Factory series, which also involved ARPG battles. However, the removal of the marriage system in this installment also departs from any previous or later game in the Harvest Moon/Story of Seasons series except for Harvest Moon GB, Harvest Moon 2 GBC, and Harvest Moon: Save the Homeland

Reception

Both Innocent Life and its Special Edition received "mixed or average reviews" according to the review aggregation website Metacritic. IGN said of the former in its U.S. review that the story develops slowly and the gameplay strays too far from Harvest Moon traditional farming focus. In Japan, Famitsu gave the PSP original a score of one eight and three sevens for a total of 29 out of 40.

References

External links
  
 
 

2006 video games
Marvelous Entertainment
Natsume (company) games
PlayStation 2 games
PlayStation Network games
PlayStation Portable games
Video games developed in Japan
Story of Seasons spin-off games
Rising Star Games games
Single-player video games
Red Ant Enterprises games